Cucamonga is a name for the city of Rancho Cucamonga, California.

Cucamonga may also refer to:
 Cucamonga (album), a compilation involving Frank Zappa and Paul Buff
 Cucamonga Peak, in the San Gabriel Mountains
 Cucamonga Valley, a region of the Pomona Valley and San Bernardino Valley
 Cucamonga Valley AVA, a wine-growing region
 Cucamonga Wilderness, an area in the eastern San Gabriel Mountains
 Cucamonga Winery, a business from 1933 to 1975
 Rancho Cucamonga, an 1839 Mexican land grant

See also
 Cucamonga Junction, Arizona, an evacuated mining settlement in the Kaibab National Forest